The Progressive Policy Institute (PPI) is a non-profit, 501(c)(3) organization that serves as a public policy think tank in the United States. The Democratic Leadership Council (DLC) founded it in 1989. The Washington Post has described it as "a centrist Democratic institution."

Key people
Its current president is Will Marshall, who writes on foreign policy, defense, national service, globalization, trade policy, and cultural issues. The organization's executive director is Lindsay Lewis. 

Its chief economic strategist is Michael Mandel, who writes on innovation, growth, and regulatory policy. Several former leading government officials have held senior positions or affiliations with the organization, including William Galston, Austan Goolsbee, Elaine Kamarck, Bruce Reed, Andrew Rotherham, Robert J. Shapiro, Paul Weinstein, and Ed Gresser.

Center for New Liberalism
In February 2020, the Neoliberal Project joined as a new initiative of the Progressive Policy Institute. Their network comprises over eighty chapters across the world. The national organization produces a podcast, conference and livestreamed events. The Neoliberal Project also runs an annual competition to select the "Neoliberal Shill" of the year. In June 2020, the Neoliberal Project was reorganized as project of the newly created Center for New Liberalism.

See also 
 Democratic Leadership Council
 Policy Network
 Third Way

References

External links 
 

Democratic Party (United States) organizations
Organizations established in 1989
Political and economic think tanks in the United States
Foreign policy and strategy think tanks in the United States
Institutes based in the United States
501(c)(3) organizations
Neoliberal organizations
Centrist political advocacy groups in the United States